The 1912 Morris Harvey football team represented the Morris Harvey College—now known as the University of Charleston– in Charleston, West Virginia during the 1912 college football season.

Schedule

References

Morris Harvey
Charleston Golden Eagles football seasons
Morris Harvey football